Jeroen van Koningsbrugge (born 3 September 1973) is a Dutch actor, comedian, singer, director and presenter. He has appeared in more than thirty films since 1999. He was a member of the television programme De Lama's and together with his friend Dennis van de Ven he makes a satirical television programme called Neonletters and Draadstaal. Together with van de Ven he has a band called Jurk.

Selected filmography

References

External links 

1973 births
Living people
Dutch male film actors
Dutch male television actors
21st-century Dutch male actors